Doon Sarla Academy is a coeducational school in Uttarakhand, India. It was founded by J.C. Sharma and established in 1991 in the memory of Smt. Sarla Devi. The school has roughly 540 students. The school's motto is "Duty, Discipline and Devotion".

The school is recognized by the Government of Uttarakhand and is in the process of attaining recognition from C.B.S.E. board.

School information 

Mrs. Anubha Sharma is the school's principal. She has more than 25 years of educational experience.

This school's primary medium of instruction is English and the student teacher ratio is 54:1.

They recently started offering a virtual school program, which is described as "A user friendly online system that provides parents an exclusive access to all information about their ward/wards."

Second branch 

Doon Sarla Academy is in the process of opening a new branch up to 12th standard, affiliated by CBSE, which is scheduled to open in 2017. The location of the new campus will be in Mothrowala Cantt, Dehradun, 6 km from ISBT and 7 km from Dehradun's railway station.

References

External links
http://paryavaranmitra.in/UK_1.%20Doon%20Sarla%20Academy,%20Dehradun.pdf

High schools and secondary schools in Uttarakhand
Schools in Dehradun
Educational institutions established in 1991
1991 establishments in Uttar Pradesh